Lyle James "Rocky" Rockenbach (March 1, 1915 – November 8, 2005) was an American football player.  He played college football for Michigan State College (later known as Michigan State University) from 1937 to 1939. He blocked three punts in a single game against Temple in 1937.  He was a co-captain of the 1939 Michigan State team, and was also honored as the team's most valuable player.  After graduating from Michigan State, he became a high school coach in Howell, Michigan.  In the summer of 1943, he attempted a comeback as a professional football player for the Detroit Lions. He appeared in nine games for the Lions during the 1943 NFL season.

References

1915 births
2005 deaths
American football guards
Michigan State Spartans football players
Detroit Lions players
Players of American football from Illinois
People from Lake County, Illinois